This article shows the rosters of all participating teams at the women's rugby sevens tournament at the 2022 Commonwealth Games in Birmingham.

Pool A

New Zealand

Canada

England

Sri Lanka

Pool B

Fiji

Australia

Scotland

South Africa

References

Commonwealth Games rugby sevens squads